Lanwaley is a town in the north-central Mudug region of Somalia.

References
Lanwaley, Mudug, Somalia

Populated places in Mudug
Galmudug